Trinity Bay may refer to:

 MV Trinity Bay, a merchant ship
 Trinity Bay, Newfoundland and Labrador, Canada
 Trinity Bay (Queensland), Australia
 Trinity Bay (Texas), United States

See also

 Trinity Bay North
 Trinity Bay State High School